Inkpen is a surname. Notable people with the surname include:

Barbara Inkpen (born 1949), British track and field athlete
Dave Inkpen (born 1954), Canadian ice hockey player
Kori Inkpen, Canadian computer scientist
Mick Inkpen (born 1952), British author and illustrator